Raja Shiva Prasad College is an undergraduate school for arts and science and also postgraduate college for commerce located on Jharia-Dhanbad Road near Jharia at Bhagatdih, Jharkhand.

History
The erstwhile Raja of Jharia, Raja Kali Prasad Singh felt a need for college in the region and he constituted a trust for establishing the college in 1949 to start  Raja Shiv Prasad College in the memory of his father, late Raja Shiva Prasad Singh. The college finally came into existence in year 1951. It is the oldest college of the Dhanbad district and surrounding area.

Affiliations
In 1951 the college secured temporary affiliation with Patna University. A year later in 1952 Bihar University granted permanent affiliation to the college. In 1960 with the establishment of Ranchi University it got affiliated to it. Previously it was affiliated to the Vinoba Bhave University, which was established in 1992.
. The college is now affiliated to the Binod Bihari Mahto Koyalanchal University, Dhanbad from 2017
.

Courses
The college offers undergraduate course in Bachelor of Arts and Bachelor of Science degrees. In Commerce it offers both undergraduate Bachelor of Commerce and graduate Doctorate courses. Further, it also offers Bachelor of Education course and also offers Bachelor of Business Administration course.

See also
Education in India
Literacy in India
List of institutions of higher education in Jharkhand

References

External links
http://www.rspcollege.org/

Colleges affiliated to Binod Bihari Mahto Koyalanchal University
Commerce colleges in India
Arts colleges in India
Fashion schools in India
Science colleges in India
Universities and colleges in Jharkhand
Business schools in Jharkhand
Education in Dhanbad district
Educational institutions established in 1951
1951 establishments in Bihar